The Tulgigin clan are one of nine distinct named clan estate groups of the Yugambeh people and the name refers to the Indigenous people of the Tweed area in the Tweed Shire, New South Wales, Australia.

Name 
The ethnonym Tulgigin has been related to a Yugambeh word, Tulgi, which refers to the "dry forests" with -gin meaning "people" and thus means "Dry Forest People". Their country was typified by the sclerophyll environment.

Language 
The Tulgigin people spoke Nganduwal, of which a few hundred words have been preserved; it is a dialect of the Yugambeh language.

Comparisons with neighbouring clan word lists in the Tweed Valley showed they spoke the same variety of language.

Country 
Their tribal boundaries are said to have extended south of the Tallebudgera Creek to the Tweed River, west to Mt. Wollumbin, and the sea the east.

According to John Allen's map, the Tweed clan were located south of the Kombumerri clan.

See also 
 Yugambeh people
 Wanggeriburra clan
 Kombumerri clan
 Mununjali clan

Citations

Sources 

Aboriginal peoples of New South Wales